Dariusz Białkowski (born 16 July 1970 in Białogard) is a Polish sprint canoeist who competed from the early 1990s to the early 2000s (decade). Competing in three Summer Olympics, he won two bronze medals. Kotowicz won them in the K-2 1000 m in 1992 and in the K-4 1000 m in 2000. He represent club Astoria Bydgoszcz.

Białkowski also won four bronze medals at the ICF Canoe Sprint World Championships, earning them in the K-2 1000 m (1995, 1997), K-4 500 m (1995), and K-4 1000 m (1995) events.

References

1970 births
Canoeists at the 1992 Summer Olympics
Canoeists at the 1996 Summer Olympics
Canoeists at the 2000 Summer Olympics
Astoria Bydgoszcz members
Living people
Olympic canoeists of Poland
Olympic bronze medalists for Poland
Polish male canoeists
Olympic medalists in canoeing
People from Białogard
ICF Canoe Sprint World Championships medalists in kayak
Sportspeople from West Pomeranian Voivodeship
Medalists at the 2000 Summer Olympics
Medalists at the 1992 Summer Olympics
20th-century Polish people